Kristine Y. Lee (born April 21, 1985 in Worcester, United States) is an American figure skater who competes representing Hong Kong. She placed 16th at the 2006 Karl Schäfer Memorial.

Competitive highlights

References

External links
 

Hong Kong female single skaters
American female single skaters
1985 births
Living people
Sportspeople from Worcester, Massachusetts
American sportspeople of Hong Kong descent